Laura Linney is an American actress who has played roles in film, television and theater:

Film

Television

Theatre

Notes

References 

American filmographies
Actress filmographies